Salaiola is a village in Tuscany, central Italy, administratively a frazione of the comune of Arcidosso, province of Grosseto, in the area of Mount Amiata. At the time of the 2001 census its population amounted to 39.

Salaiola is about 55 km from Grosseto and 8 km from Arcidosso, and it is situated on the slopes of Mount Aquileia, one of the peaks of Mount Amiata. Here once stood the early medieval village of Roveta.

Main sights 
 Church of Madonna, main parish church of the village, it was built in 1863.
 Chapel of San Girolamo, old chapel of Casal Roveta.
 Casal Roveta, old farmhouse situated near the village, it is the last evidence of the ancient settlement of Roveta.

References

Bibliography 
 Aldo Mazzolai, Guida della Maremma. Percorsi tra arte e natura, Le Lettere, Florence, 1997

See also 
 Bagnoli, Arcidosso
 Le Macchie
 Montelaterone
 San Lorenzo, Arcidosso
 Stribugliano
 Zancona

Frazioni of Arcidosso